Barilius is a large genus of cyprinid freshwater fishes native to Asia. Four species in this genus have been described since 2012.

Species
There are currently 31 recognized species in this genus:

 Barilius ardens Knight, A. Rai, D’Souza & Vijaykrishnan, 2015
 Barilius bakeri (F. Day, 1865)
 Barilius barila (F. Hamilton, 1822)
 Barilius bendelisis (F. Hamilton, 1807)
 Barilius bonarensis B. L. Chaudhuri, 1912
 Barilius borneensis T. R. Roberts, 1989
 Barilius canarensis (Jerdon, 1849)
 Barilius caudiocellatus X. L. Chu, 1984
 Barilius chatricensis Selim & Vishwanath, 2002
 Barilius cyanochlorus  Plamoottil & Vineeth, 2020  (Kazargod Barilius)
 Barilius dimorphicus Tilak & Husain, 1990
 Barilius dogarsinghi Hora, 1921
 Barilius evezardi F. Day, 1872
 Barilius gatensis (Valenciennes, 1844)
 Barilius huahinensis Fowler, 1934 (possibly junior synonym of Opsarius koratensis)
 Barilius infrafasciatus Fowler, 1934
 Barilius lairokensis Arunkumar & Tombi Singh, 2000
 Barilius malabaricus Jerdon, 1849
 Barilius mesopotamicus L. S. Berg, 1932
 Barilius modestus F. Day, 1872
 Barilius naseeri Mirza, Rafiq & F. A. Awan, 1986
 Barilius nelsoni Barman, 1988
 Barilius ngawa Vishwanath & Manojkumar, 2002
 Barilius ornatus Sauvage, 1883
 Barilius pakistanicus Mirza & Sadiq, 1978
 Barilius pectoralis Husain, 2012
 Barilius ponticulus (H. M. Smith, 1945)
 Barilius profundus Dishma & Vishwanath, 2012
 Barilius radiolatus Günther, 1868
 Barilius shacra (F. Hamilton, 1822)
 Barilius signicaudus Tejavej, 2012
 Barilius vagra (F. Hamilton, 1822)

References